Leeds City bus station serves the city of Leeds, England. Owned and managed by West Yorkshire Metro, it is situated between the Quarry Hill and Leeds Kirkgate Markets areas of Leeds city centre. The National Express Dyer Street Coach Station adjoins the bus station.

History

The bus station was opened on 31 August 1938 as Leeds Central bus station. It was built at the same time and in the same style as the Quarry Hill flats. The original bus station was used as the back-drop for the opening credits of Yorkshire Television sitcom Queenie's Castle.

The station was rebuilt reopening on 30 September 1963 with four curved platforms. In 1990, Vicar Lane bus station closed and West Yorkshire Road Car Company buses began using the main bus station. It was again rebuilt, being officially reopened on 25 March 1996 when National Express relocated to the site. Wellington Street coach station was closed when the new station opened.

The bus station is 800 metres away from Leeds railway station meaning there is no central transport hub in Leeds. To answer this a small bus interchange was constructed at the railway station in 2005 and linked to the bus station by a FreeCityBus service, which was replaced by the LeedsCityBus service in April 2011.

Architecture
The building replaced a series of steel and concrete bus shelters. In line with most new bus stations in West Yorkshire, Leeds City is fully enclosed. The building is a single-storey brick-built structure with a glass roof that runs the full length of the bus station, allowing the maximum use of natural light. There are two concourses within the station, the bus concourse is situated on the eastern side of the building with 25 bays, while the National Express concourse is situated on the western side with nine bays.

Services
Arriva Yorkshire, First Leeds, Harrogate Bus Company, Keighley Bus Company, Megabus and Yorkshire Coastliner operate services from the eastern concourse. On Sundays, some DalesBus services serve the bus station.

National Express operates services from the western concourse.

The Flyer service runs to Leeds Bradford Airport.

References

External links

Central bus station St Peter's Street - Leodis
Leeds Central bus station (Picture of new bus station in the background) flickr

Buildings and structures in Leeds
Bus stations in West Yorkshire
Transport in Leeds
Transport infrastructure completed in 1938
1938 establishments in England